Gallium phosphate (GaPO4 or gallium orthophosphate) is a colorless trigonal crystal with a hardness of 5.5 on the Mohs scale.  GaPO4 is isotypic with quartz, possessing very similar properties, but the silicon atoms are alternately substituted with gallium and phosphorus, thereby doubling the piezoelectric effect.  GaPO4 has many advantages over quartz for technical applications, like a higher electromechanical coupling coefficient in resonators, due to this doubling.
Contrary to quartz, GaPO4 is not found in nature.  Therefore, a hydrothermal process must be used to synthesize the crystal.

Modifications
GaPO4 possesses, in contrast to quartz, no α-β phase transition, thus the low temperature structure (structure like α-quartz) of GaPO4 is stable up to 970°C, as are most of its other physical properties.  Around 970°C another phase transition occurs which changes the low quartz structure into another structure similar with cristobalite.

Structure
The specific structure of GaPO4 shows the arrangement of tetrahedrons consisting of GaO4 and PO4 that are slightly tilted.  Because of the helical arrangement of these tetrahedrons, two modifications of GaPO4 exist with different optical rotation (left and right).

Sources
GaPO4 does not occur in nature; thus it must be grown synthetically.  Presently, only one company in Austria produces these crystals commercially.

History and technical importance
Pressure sensors based on quartz have to be cooled with water for applications at higher temperatures (above 300°C).  Starting in 1994 it was possible to substitute these big sensors with miniaturized, non cooled ones, based on GaPO4.
Further exceptional properties of GaPO4  for applications at high temperatures include its nearly temperature independent piezo effect and excellent electrical insulation up to 900°C.  For bulk resonator applications, this crystal exhibits temperature compensated cuts of up to 500°C while having Q factors comparable with quartz. Due to these material properties, GaPO4  is very suitable for piezoelectric pressure sensors at high temperatures and for high temperature microbalance.

Literature

External links
data sheet

Gallium compounds
Phosphates
Piezoelectric materials